Henry Lorenz Viereck (28 March 1881, Philadelphia - 8 October 1931, Loudonville, New York) 
was an American entomologist who specialised in Hymenoptera. He wrote Guide to the insects of Connecticut.  Pt. III. The Hymenoptera, or wasp-like insects of Connecticut.  Conn. State Geol. & Nat. Hist. Survey No. 22: 1-824 and many other works.

References
Mallis, A. 1971 American Entomologists. Rutgers Univ. Press New Brunswick. 
Osborn, H. 1937 Fragments of Entomological History Including Some Personal Recollections of Men and Events.  Columbus, Ohio, Published by the Author.
Osborn, H. 1952 A Brief History of Entomology Including Time of Demosthenes and Aristotle to Modern Times with over Five Hundred Portraits.  Columbus, Ohio, The Spahr & Glenn Company.

External links
 

American entomologists
Hymenopterists
1881 births
1931 deaths
Scientists from Philadelphia
20th-century American zoologists